Partial general elections were held in Belgium on 10 June 1856. In the elections for the Chamber of Representatives the result was a victory for the Catholics, who won 63 of the 108 seats. Voter turnout was 60.6%, although only 43,573 people were eligible to vote.

Under the alternating system, Chamber elections were only held in four out of the nine provinces: East Flanders, Hainaut, Liège and Limburg. Thus, 54 of the 108 Chamber seats were up for election.

Results

Chamber of Representatives

References

1850s elections in Belgium
General
Belgium
Belgium